Know India Programme  abbreviated as KIP is a government initiative by the Ministry of External Affairs, Government of India for the Indian diaspora (excluding NRIs) between the age group of 18 to 30 years. It was launched on 8 January 2014, on the occasion of Pravasi Bharatiya Divas in New Delhi. The purpose of the Know India Programme is to help Persons of Indian Origin youths familiarize with their roots and contemporary India and provide them an exposure to the country of their origin. From 2016, six KIPs a year are being organised.

Overview  
The substance of the programme broadly includes the following:

 Presentations on India, political process, developments in various sectors
 Interaction with faculty and students at a prestigious University/College/Institute
 Presentation on the industrial development and visits to some Industries
 Visit a village to better understand the typical village life of India
 Exposure to Indian media
 Interaction with non-governmental organizations and organizations dealing with women affairs
 Visit places of historical importance and monuments
 Taking part in Cultural programmes
 Exposure to Yoga
 Call on high dignitaries, which may include President of India, Chief Election Commissioner of India, Comptroller and Auditor General of India, and Ministers in-charge of The Ministry, Youth Affairs and Sports
 Visit a select state in India for 10 days

References

External links
 Official website
 Government Introduces "Know India Programme" for NRI and PIO Youth on Press Information Bureau

Modi administration initiatives
Projects established in 2014
2014 in India